Iraq national amateur boxing athletes represents Iraq in regional, continental and world boxing tournaments and matches sanctioned by the International Boxing Association (AIBA).

Olympics

2004 Athens Olympics

Iraq was represented by one boxer in this edition of the Olympiad, in the Light flyweight division. He won his first bout but was defeated in the second.

Entry list
Light Flyweight - Najah Ali

Asian Games

2006 Doha Asian Games

Five boxers represented Iraq in this edition of the Asiad. Three of the five athletes made it to the quarterfinals but none succeeded in pushing through the semifinals, leaving Iraq ranked 15th in boxing.

Entry list
 Featherweight - MAHDI Suraka
 Flyweight - MUTUSHR Majeed
 Light Flyweight - NAJAH Ali
 Light Welterweight - ZUHIR Jabar
 Heavyweight - ALI Salman

References

Boxing in Iraq